Lectionary 2144 designated by sigla ℓ 2144 (in the Gregory-Aland numbering), is a Greek minuscule manuscript of the New Testament, written on 5 parchment leaves (22.5 cm by 15.3 cm). Paleographically it has been assigned to the 12th or 13th century.

Description 
The codex contains Lessons from the four Gospels lectionary (Evangelistarium). It is written in two columns per page, in 28 lines per page.

History 

The codex once belonged to Kenneth Willis Clark. Currently it is located in the Kenneth Willis Clark Collection of the Duke University (Gk MS 27)  at Durham.

See also 

 List of New Testament lectionaries
 Biblical manuscript
 Textual criticism

References

External links 
 Lectionary 2144 at the Kenneth Willis Clark Collection of Greek Manuscripts

Greek New Testament lectionaries
12th-century biblical manuscripts
Duke University Libraries